Chief of Army may refer to:

Chief of Army (Australia)
Chief of Army (Malaysia)
Chief of Army (Singapore)
Chief of Army (Sweden)

See also
Chief of Army Staff (disambiguation)